Larvik Lions is the name of an American football team located in Larvik, Norway and a former affiliate of the Norway American Football Federation.

American football teams in Norway
Larvik